Colle di Nava at  is a mountain pass in the Province of Imperia in Italy. It is located on the main chain of the Alps and connects Ormea and the Tanaro Valley (CN) with Pieve di Teco and Imperia, the latter on the coast of Ligurian Sea. According both to the SOIUSA and the CAI, the pass marks the Western border of the Ligurian Prealps.

Hiking 
The pass is also accessible by off-road mountain paths and is crossed by the Alta Via dei Monti Liguri, a long-distance trail from Ventimiglia (province of Imperia) to Bolano (province of La Spezia).

See also
 List of mountain passes

References

Bibliography

 

Nava
Nava